Muhammad Akram (born 2 February 1971) is a Pakistani rower. He competed in the men's single sculls event at the 2000 Summer Olympics.

References

1971 births
Living people
Pakistani male rowers
Olympic rowers of Pakistan
Rowers at the 2000 Summer Olympics
Sportspeople from Sialkot
Asian Games medalists in rowing
Rowers at the 1998 Asian Games
Rowers at the 2002 Asian Games
Rowers at the 2006 Asian Games
Asian Games bronze medalists for Pakistan
Medalists at the 1998 Asian Games
Medalists at the 2002 Asian Games
21st-century Pakistani people